Jean Louis Jeanvoix (24 December 1864 – 6 July 1938) was a French fencer. He competed in the men's masters épée event at the 1900 Summer Olympics.

References

External links
 

1864 births
1938 deaths
French male épée fencers
Olympic fencers of France
Fencers at the 1900 Summer Olympics
Sportspeople from Indre-et-Loire